Clark's Lookout State Park is a Montana state park located one mile north of the community of Dillon. The  park encompasses the hill overlooking the Beaverhead River that William Clark climbed on August 13, 1805, during the Lewis and Clark Expedition. From the vantage point, Clark took various compass readings and sketched a map of the Beaverhead Valley. The park offers picnicking, interpretive signage, and a chance to make the climb that Clark made and stand where he stood.

References

External links
Clark's Lookout State Park Montana Fish, Wildlife & Parks
Clark's Lookout State Park Trail Map Montana Fish, Wildlife & Parks

State parks of Montana
Protected areas of Beaverhead County, Montana
Protected areas established in 1985
1985 establishments in Montana